Manakkal Ayyempet is an Indian village in Tiruvarur District in Tamil Nadu.

Etymology

History

Geography and climate

Demographics 
As of 2011 census, Ayyampettai had a population of 3546 with 1784 males and 1762 females. The sex ratio was 987. The literacy rate was 81.34.

References

Villages in Tiruvarur district